A list of the English-language Shadowrun books, with their SKU numbers.

Sourcebooks
 Four digit numbers were published by FASA; sometimes prefixed by "FAS"
 Five digit numbers were published by:
FanPro: 106××, 250××, and 2600×; sometimes prefixed with "FPR"
Catalyst: 26×××, with the third digit specifying the book type; 0 for core rulebooks, 1 for core supplements, 2 for settings (locations), 3 for general sourcebooks, 4 for Adventure, 6 for Rules Supplement, 7 for premium, 8 for fiction and 9 for misc; sometimes prefixed with "CAT", "CGL" or "CYT"

Core rulebooks and supplements are primarily composed of rules, and tend to be replaced quickly when a new edition of the game is released. They can be difficult to use with other editions. Second and Third edition were pretty similar, while the Fourth and 20th Anniversary editions were quite different than the first three. Fifth edition built on the Fourth/20th anniversary, while Sixth edition again makes a number of changes to the core rules.  Shadowrun Anarchy is almost a different system entirely.

Sourcebooks are a mix of rules and setting. As such, they contain setting information applicable to any edition of the game, and statistics that may need a little updating. Foreign language editions of sourcebooks often contain additional content relating to local variants on the topic in question. Sometimes even whole original books have been published concentrating solely on providing local source material.

Magazines
There were two short lived, FASA approved, paper magazines for Shadowrun. The first—KA•GE—was published by The Shadowrun Network, with thirteen issues. The second—Shadowland—was published by Sword of the Knight Publications, with seven issues.

† If there was no in game date on the cover, the most recent date-stamp within the issue is listed.

† The most recent date-stamp within the issue.

Novels and other fiction
FASA published the original trade paperback through Contemporary Books. All subsequent novels were published by ROC, 40 with FASA (1990–2001), and six with WizKids (circa 2006). When the FASA era novels were re-released in 2003 the ISBNs were updated to include FASA's four digit SKU (ISBN ×-×××-×FFFF-×), prior to this the FASA SKU and ISBN were generally unrelated. The six novels produced by WizKids circa 2006 were loosely linked to Shadowrun Duels.

Alongside translations of the English-language novels and RPG books, German publishers Heyne and Fantasy Productions put out a number of original German-language novels, written exclusively by German authors and also set in Germany. Even after publication of English-language novels stopped in 2001 both publishers continued to put out original novels in Germany until license shifts occurred in 2008.

By that time, Catalyst Game Labs announced that new English Shadowrun novels would be released starting in 2009. Since then, novels, novellas and "enhanced" fiction books have been released on a regular basis.  Enhanced fiction releases include stats for characters and gear as well as plot hooks for adventures related to the book.

Notes

Shadowrun
Novels based on role-playing games
Science fiction role-playing game supplements
Shadowrun